Final results for the Boxing competition at the 1990 Commonwealth Games in Auckland, New Zealand, from 24 January to 3 February.

Light Flyweight (– 48 kg)

Flyweight (– 51 kg)

Bantamweight (– 54 kg)

Featherweight (– 57 kg)

Lightweight (– 60 kg)

Light Welterweight (– 63.5 kg)

Welterweight (– 67 kg)

Light Middleweight (– 71 kg)

Middleweight (– 75 kg)

Light Heavyweight (– 81 kg)

Heavyweight (– 91 kg)

Super Heavyweight (> 91 kg)

See also
Boxing at the 1930 British Empire Games
Boxing at the 1986 Commonwealth Games
Boxing at the 2002 Commonwealth Games
Boxing at the 2006 Commonwealth Games
Boxing at the 2010 Commonwealth Games

References
 Amateur Boxing

1990 Commonwealth Games events
1990
Commonwealth Games
Boxing in New Zealand